Nottingham West was a borough constituency in the city of Nottingham.  It returned one Member of Parliament (MP)  to the House of Commons of the Parliament of the United Kingdom.

The constituency was created for the 1885 general election, and abolished for the 1950 general election.  However, a new Nottingham West constituency was created for the 1955 general election, and was in turn abolished for the 1983 general election.

Boundaries 
1885–1918: The Borough of Nottingham wards of Broxtowe, Forest, St Albans, Sherwood, and Wollaton.

1918–1955: The County Borough of Nottingham wards of Broxtowe, St Albans, and Wollaton.

The constituency was renamed Nottingham North West from 1950 to 1955, but its boundaries remained unchanged.

1955–1974: The County Borough of Nottingham wards of Abbey, Broxtowe, Robin Hood, and Wollaton.

1974–1983: The County Borough of Nottingham wards of Abbey, Broxtowe, Clifton, Robin Hood, University, and Wollaton.

Members of Parliament

MPs 1885-1950

MPs 1955-1983

Elections

Elections in the 1880s

Elections in the 1890s

Elections in the 1900s

Elections in the 1910s

Elections in the 1920s

Elections in the 1930s

Elections in the 1940s

Elections in the 1950s

Elections in the 1960s

Elections in the 1970s

References 

Parliamentary constituencies in Nottinghamshire (historic)
Constituencies of the Parliament of the United Kingdom established in 1885
Constituencies of the Parliament of the United Kingdom disestablished in 1950
Constituencies of the Parliament of the United Kingdom established in 1955
Constituencies of the Parliament of the United Kingdom disestablished in 1983